Col. Mustafa Ould Salek (‎ 1936 – 18 December 2012) was the President of Mauritania from 1978 through 1979.

Biography 
Mustafa Ould Salek was appointed army commander by longtime President Moktar Ould Daddah in February 1978, as the country faced dire economic crisis and was failing to contain the Polisario Front's Sahrawi guerrillas after invading Western Sahara in 1975 in alliance with Morocco. On July 10, 1978, Ould Salek led a military coup d'état against President Daddah, and was appointed head of the 20-man junta, the Military Committee for National Recovery (CMRN) that was to rule the country. He died in a Paris hospital aged 76.

Seen as pro-French and careful not to break his country's alliance with Morocco, he failed to make peace with the Polisario (which had reacted to Daddah's downfall by entering into a unilateral ceasefire on the assumption that Mauritania would want to withdraw peacefully from the conflict). He also failed to address racial tension between southern Mauritanian Blacks and the northern Arab Moors, discriminating heavily in favour of the latter group, of which he was himself a member. Consequently, he became increasingly isolated within the regime. On April 6, 1979, a second coup by Colonels Ahmed Ould Bouceif and Mohamed Khouna Ould Haidalla reduced Ould Salek to a figurehead President in the replacement junta, the 24-man Military Committee for National Salvation (CMSN). In May, he was replaced as president by Colonel Mohamed Mahmoud Ould Louly.

Between 1981 and 1984 he was imprisoned, and he later stood as an independent candidate in the 1992 presidential election, gaining 2.9% of the vote.

References 

1936 births
2012 deaths
Leaders who took power by coup
Mauritanian military personnel
Heads of state of Mauritania
Prisoners and detainees of Mauritania
Mauritanian prisoners and detainees
People from Assaba Region